Route 141, also known as Woods Mill Road in parts of St. Louis County, is a state highway located in the western St. Louis metropolitan area. Its northern terminus is at Route 370 in Bridgeton; its southern terminus is at U.S. Route 61/U.S. Route 67 in Arnold, in Jefferson County. The northern stretches of the highway are often referred to as the Maryland Heights Expressway or Earth City Expressway.

Route description
For the majority of its duration, Route 141 is a divided highway with four to eight lanes.

Jefferson County

In Jefferson County, Route 141 is a four-lane highway. It has a southern terminus at U.S. Route 61/U.S. Route 67 in Arnold. At this point, it is an at-grade route with business driveways and traffic lights. It continues northwest and has a hybrid SPUI and diamond interchange with I-55. After the interchange, it becomes a rural highway with two lanes on each side of a wide grass median. While nearing the Meramec River, the highway has an at-grade intersection with Old Missouri State Road. After this intersection, the grassy median ends and the road is instead separated by a Jersey barrier. The route then has a diamond interchange with the Route 21 freeway. After this interchange, Route 141 again sports a wide grassy median. It continues north and crosses the county line into Fenton in St. Louis County.

St. Louis County
Route 141 enters St. Louis County in Fenton. It has an interchange with Route 30 and widens into a six- to eight-lane divided highway. Heading north, Route 141 passes a plaza to the left that includes various restaurants, including St. Louis Bread Company, McDonald's, and Pizza Hut. After the plaza, Route 141 heads into a suburban area and has at-grade interchanges with several collector roads. The highway heads northeast and has an interchange with Interstate 44 in Valley Park. Shortly after this interchange, Route 141 crosses the Meramec River and the  Meramec River Greenway and enters Valley Park.

In Valley Park, Route 141 passes over, and then under, a pair of railroad tracks and has several at-grade intersections with local road. Heading north, the highway passes the Valley Park water tower and abruptly turns northwest. The road then enters Twin Oaks and has a SPUI with Big Bend Road. Shortly after the interchange, Route 141 enters Manchester. The road weaves through suburban areas, and after an at-grade intersection with Carmen Road, Route 141 gains outer roads in both directions. The highway then has a SPUI with Missouri Route 100 (Manchester Road) while heading directly north. After this interchange, Route 141 has an at-grade intersection with a plaza containing a Costco and a Walmart Supercenter.

Past the intersection, Route 141 serves as a border between Missouri River Township and Ballwin. The highway continues to mainly serve suburban areas. The road weaves northeast and enters Town and Country. Route 141 then has a hybrid trumpet interchange with Clayton Road and briefly becomes a controlled-access highway. Woods Mill Road serves as an outer road. The freeway ends at a signalized hybrid interchange with Interstate 64/US 40/US 61. Maryville University is located to the east. Route 141 subsequently clips the eastern edge of Chesterfield and passes St. Luke's Hospital.

Past this point, Route 141 becomes a controlled-access freeway. It has a SPUI with Ladue Road (Route AB). The highway curves northeastwards, passing Parkway Central High School, which is located to the west of the road. Shortly after passing the school, Route 141 curves back northward and heads through a wooded area. Subsequently, Route 141 as a SPUI interchange with Route 340 (Olive Boulevard). Route 141 becomes elevated after the interchange, crossing over Creve Coeur Creek and several other streams, and passing a neighborhood to the west. Route 141 then crosses Waterworks Road and railroad tracks, entering Maryland Heights. The name of the road changes to Maryland Heights Expressway. Shortly after entering Maryland Heights, Route 141 has a SPUI with Route 364, After that, Route 141 passes Hollywood Casino Amphitheatre, and has an interchange with Interstate 70, and the highway splits between north and southbound and reconnecting at Route 180 (St Charles Rock Road) 

The highway meets its northern terminus after the interchange with Route 370 at Missouri Bottom Road.

History
Old Highway 141 was a two-lane road built in the 1930s. The idea of an newer, divided highway carrying the Route 141 designation dates to the 1970s, when regional highway planners adopted the idea of an "outer belt" west of I-270. In 1976, Frank Kriz, then the district state highway engineer, called 141 an "old ridge-runner." The highways had traffic jams due to suburban growth. That same year, construction began for a new, four-lane Highway 141 in Jefferson County. Subsequent progress included a new bridge over the Meramec River at Valley Park in 1986 and a new interchange at Manchester Road in 1999. The section of Route 141 between Interstate 64 and the St. Louis County/Jefferson County line was upgraded to six lanes in a project completed in 2003.

Extension
In August 2012, a six-lane realignment opened between Ladue Road and Page Avenue (Route 364), with interchanges at Ladue, Olive (Route 340), and Page.  The section between Page and Olive (tentatively titled the Page-Olive Connector), which was constructed by St. Louis County has been turned over to the Missouri Department of Transportation and designated as Route 141. Maryland Heights Expressway (the section from Page north to I-70) and Earth City Expressway (the section from I-70 north to its terminus at Route 370) have also been designated as 141. As such, Route 141 now runs from US 61/67 in Arnold to Route 370 in Bridgeton.
 
The Missouri Department of Transportation (MoDOT) in cooperation with the St. Louis County Department of Highways and Traffic (DHT) expanded Route 141. 1 between just south of Ladue Road (Route AB) to Olive Boulevard (Route 340). DHT extended Route 141 from Olive Boulevard to the Page Avenue Extension (Route 364) at the Maryland Heights Expressway which links to the Earth City Expressway which continues north to Route 370 where it then turns into Missouri Bottom Road via Aubuchon Road. SPUIs were constructed at Ladue Road and Olive Blvd. There were some construction constraints with the part of the project between Olive and Page. DHT held studies of the environment to decide how to maneuver construction without disturbing some of the native wetlands in the corridor. During heavy rain, the current intersection at Creve Coeur Mill Road and Olive has the potential to flood, and most of the area along Creve Coeur Mill Road are either wetlands or farmland that lies in a flood plain.

St. Louis County Executive Charlie Dooley had called the project "one of St. Louis County's largest and most important infrastructure improvements this decade."  The economic impact of the construction project was not nearly as massive as the upgrading and realignment project on Interstate 64/Highway 40. This construction project was estimated to have a $20 billion economic impact and create over 170,000 jobs during the 2010 decade.

Major intersections

References

141
Transportation in Jefferson County, Missouri
Transportation in St. Louis County, Missouri